José Musalem Saffie (30 August 1924, Santiago – 17 March 2019) was a Chilean politician who served as a Deputy and later as a Senator.

References

1924 births
2019 deaths
People from Santiago
Chilean people of Arab descent
Chilean Roman Catholics
Conservative Party (Chile) politicians
Social Christian Conservative Party politicians
National Falange politicians
Christian Democratic Party (Chile) politicians
Deputies of the XLII Legislative Period of the National Congress of Chile
Deputies of the XLIII Legislative Period of the National Congress of Chile
Deputies of the XLIV Legislative Period of the National Congress of Chile
Senators of the XLV Legislative Period of the National Congress of Chile
Senators of the XLVI Legislative Period of the National Congress of Chile
University of Chile alumni